David Howard Senjem (born December 20, 1942) is an American politician currently serving on the Olmsted County Board of Commissioners. He is a former member of the Minnesota Senate, in that office from 2003 to 2023. He served as its majority leader from 2011 to 2013. A moderate Republican, Senjem has crossed party lines on many occasions, notably environmental policy and women's issues. He represented District 25, which at the time included portions of Dodge and Olmsted counties in the southeastern part of the state. Much of the northern half of Rochester was in his district.

In April 2022, Senjem announced that he would not seek reelection to the Minnesota Senate, and later announced that he would instead run for Olmsted County Commissioner for District 2.

Early life, education, and career
Senjem grew up in Hayfield, Minnesota and attended Hayfield High School. After graduating, he earned a Bachelor of Arts degree from Luther College in Decorah, Iowa. He served on the Rochester City Park Board for five years, then on the Rochester City Council from 1992 to 2002. He is a retired Environmental Affairs Officer for the Mayo Clinic in Rochester.

Senjem's family originates from Bingen, Buskerud County, Norway; the original family name was Sønju. His great-great-grandfather John N. Hanson served as a Republican state representative from Dodge County from 1873 to 1874.

Political positions

Senjem is generally regarded as a moderate and centrist Republican. He has been reelected multiple times even when his district backed Democratic candidates in other races. He has received praise from both sides for his bipartisanship. In January 2021, Democratic Attorney General Keith Ellison described Senjem as "open-minded" and said, "In an age where the parties are as polarized as at any point in our nation's history, Senjem is a guy who's willing to work across the aisle."

Environment

Senjem is a member of the National Caucus of Environmental Legislators.

The NCEL awarded Senjem with the 2021 Leon G. Billings Environmental Achievement Award in recognition of his accomplishments in environmental policy.

Senjem is currently the chair of the Senate Energy and Utilities Finance and Policy Committee. In 2021, he supported the Energy Conservation and Optimization Act despite opposition from other Republicans.

Women's Issues

Senjem is the only male and sole Republican to serve on the Advisory Task Force on Expanding the Economic Security of Women. He was appointed to the task force by Democratic Attorney General Keith Ellison. Ellison stated that Senjem's voting record shows his concern for women's issues.

Medical Marijuana

Senjem supports legalized medical marijuana. In 2014, he was one of eight Republican senators to back a bill allowing for medical marijuana in the state.

Economy

Senjem is rated highly by the Minnesota Chamber of Commerce and the National Federation of Independent Business.

Minnesota Senate
Senjem was first elected in 2002, and was reelected in 2006, 2010, 2012, 2016, and 2020. He served as minority leader from 2007 until January 3, 2011. On December 27, 2011, Senjem was elected majority leader after the previous majority leader, Amy Koch, resigned over an affair with a Senate staffer. Senjem became the third person to serve as both minority and majority leader, and the first to serve in both roles as a Republican.

Senjem tested positive for COVID-19 in November 2020. Upon finding out, the Minnesota Senate Republican chief of staff warned other Republicans of the positive test, but did not tell Democratic state legislators about the positive test, thus preventing them from taking the appropriate precautions.

References

External links

Senator Dave Senjem official Minnesota Senate website
Minnesota Public Radio Votetracker: Senator Senjem Voting Record
Follow the Money – David Senjem Campaign Contributions
2006 2002
Senator Dave Senjem official campaign website

|-

|-

1942 births
Living people
Politicians from Rochester, Minnesota
Republican Party Minnesota state senators
American Lutherans
American people of Norwegian descent
Luther College (Iowa) alumni
21st-century American politicians
People from Austin, Minnesota
People from Hayfield, Minnesota